Vexillum trophonium is a species of small sea snail, marine gastropod mollusk in the family Costellariidae, the ribbed miters.

Description
The shell grows to a length of 20 mm

Distribution
This species is distributed in the Atlantic Ocean from Florida to Brazil

References

 Turner H. 2001. Katalog der Familie Costellariidae Macdonald, 1860. Conchbooks. 1–100-page(s): 65

External links
 

trophonium
Gastropods described in 1889